Gapapaiwa, also Gapa or Paiwa, is an Austronesian language of the eastern Papua New Guinean mainland.

References

External links 
 Kaipuleohone includes a collection of materials with Gapapaiwa written materials.

Nuclear Papuan Tip languages
Languages of Milne Bay Province